The 1959  New South Wales  state election  was held on 21 March 1959. The election was for all of the 94 seats in the  Legislative Assembly.

Key dates

Redistribution
A redistribution of electoral boundaries was undertaken in 1957 based on the 1954 Australian Census. Reflecting population shifts from the eastern and inner western suburbs of Sydney to western Sydney, two safe Liberal seats, Ashfield and Croydon were combined into the seat of Ashfield-Croydon and two safe Labor seats, Paddington and Waverley were combined into Paddington-Waverley.  Merrylands was created in Western Sydney and was a notional Labor seat. In addition, the marginal seat of Parramatta became a safe Labor seat. In southern Sydney, the marginal seat of Sutherland became a safe Labor seat by the creation of Cronulla which had a notional Liberal majority. The  effect of the redistribution was to increase Labor's numbers by 1.

Issues
In March 1959, Labor had been in power for 18 years and Joseph Cahill  had been premier for 7 years.  Cahill, who was commonly known as "old smoothie" continued to be a popular premier but the opposition campaign argued that his cabinet consisted of "tired old men".  While nationally the Labor party remained divided on sectarian and ideological grounds, in New South Wales much of the split between Labor and the DLP had been avoided. Clive Evatt, the brother of H V Evatt, who had been the major left-wing agitator within the caucus was expelled from the party after he voted against a government move to increase tram fares. As a result, party unity was significantly improved.  However, a small branch of the DLP under the leadership of Jake Kane had organised in NSW and  nominated candidates at this election for the first time.

Cahill attacked the opposition for its "reckless election promises" which were "worth no more than a handful of Bondi sand" . Labor promised, that if re-elected, it would form a Commonwealth- State Housing Corporation to lend up to 95% of housing costs on a 45-year basis. It would attempt to reduce road taxes for haulage companies and promised a vigorous program of road development including the possible use of privately constructed toll roads. Cahill announced plans to build Housing Commission towers in Surry Hills and promised a referendum on the abolition of the New South Wales Legislative Council.

The coalition of the Liberal Party and the Country Party coalition had been led by Pat Morton since September 1955. However,  Morton remained a somewhat aloof figure, with a public presence more typical of pre-war conservative politicians,  and found it difficult to connect with the public. Davis Hughes, who had led the Country Party since September 1958 was forced to resign the leadership at the start of the campaign when it was revealed that he had falsely claimed to have a university degree. He was replaced by Charles Cutler.

The opposition campaigned on the government's broken promises and its continuing record of over-budget and uncompleted public works. In addition it promised to abolish several taxes including; land tax and the road maintenance tax. School transport would be free and the number of high school bursaries increased. Sewering the outer western suburbs, with a deep sea discharge, and completing the  Sandy Hollow railway line were the opposition's public works priorities. The housing crisis was to be resolved by the government construction of 100,000 houses in 3 years.

Results

The result of the election showed little change but was a clear victory for Labor with a buffer of  2 seats in the parliament. Labor regained the seat of Hurstville from  Clive Evatt who had sat as an Independent Labor member since his expulsion from the party. It had already reclaimed Kahibah at a by-election caused by the death of the Independent Labor Member Tom Armstrong. However Labor failed to take back the usually safe seat of Waratah from Frank Purdue. As expected Labor won Parramatta, Sutherland and Merrylands but lost Dubbo, Cronulla and Blacktown to the Liberals. It had already lost the seat of Wagga Wagga at a by-election caused by the death of Eddie Graham. Labor also lost Young to the Country Party.

The DLP performed poorly, finishing behind the Communist party with less than 2% of the vote.
{{Australian elections/Title row
| table style = float:right;clear:right;margin-left:1em;
| title        = New South Wales state election, 21 March 1959

| house        = Legislative Assembly
| series       = New South Wales state election
| back         = 1956
| forward      = 1962
| enrolled     = 2,075,268
| total_votes  = 1,739,580
| turnout %    = 94.00
| turnout chg  = +0.73
| informal     = 31,864
| informal %   = 1.83
| informal chg = +0.16
}}

|}

{{ bar box  | float=right | title=Popular vote | titlebar=#ddd | width=600px | barwidth=410px | bars=

}}

Retiring members

Seats changing party representation

Aftermath
Joseph Cahill died in October 1959 and was replaced by Robert Heffron who continued as Premier for the rest of the term. Pat Morton was replaced as Leader of the Opposition in July 1959 by Robert Askin. Charles Cutler remained Leader of the New South Wales Country Party throughout the term of the parliament. During the parliament there were 6 by-elections with Labor and the Country Party each winning a seat at the other party's expense.

See also
 Members of the New South Wales Legislative Assembly, 1959–1962
 Candidates of the 1959 New South Wales state election

Notes

References

Elections in New South Wales
1959 elections in Australia
1950s in New South Wales
March 1959 events in Australia